Prince Yuge (d. August 21, 699) was a Japanese prince and waka poet. He was the sixth son of Emperor Tenmu, by Princess Ōe, daughter of Emperor Tenji. His full brother was Prince Naga.

Man'yōshū poems 111, 119, 120, 121, 122, 242, 1467 and 1608 are attributed to him.

He died on the twenty-first day of the seventh month of the third year of Emperor Monmu's reign (August 21, 699). He is one of the candidates for the Takamatsuzuka Tomb.

References

Citations

Works cited 

 
 
 
 
 

Japanese princes
699 deaths
Year of birth uncertain
Sons of emperors